Sivia Sign Language is the deaf sign language of the Quechua town of Sivia in Peru. It is not related to Peruvian Sign Language.

The first generation consists of a deaf woman born in 1972, her deaf younger sister born in 1984, and a deaf friend of intermediate age. The second generation started in 1996 with the older woman's first child, who was deaf, and the rest of her and the other two women's children, all native signers, along with some additional cousins and friends.

References

Sign languages of Peru
Languages of Peru